Nekoma is an unincorporated community in Rush County, Kansas, United States.  It lies along K-96 southwest of the city of La Crosse.

History
Nekoma was platted in 1884 by the railroad. The first post office in Nekoma was established in 1890.

It has a post office with the ZIP code 67559.

Geography
Its elevation is 2,034 feet (621 m), and it is located at  (38.4736250, -99.4420547).

Education
The community is served by La Crosse USD 395 public school district.

References

Further reading

External links
 History of Cities in Rush County
 Rush County maps: Current, Historic, KDOT

Unincorporated communities in Rush County, Kansas
Unincorporated communities in Kansas